Zygogramma heterothecae is a species of beetle belonging to the family Zygogramma.

Description
Z. heterothecae is a small leaf beetle with a brown pronotum and yellow elytra marked with elongated brown stripes.

Distribution and Habitat
Z. heterothecae is native to North America. Adult beetles are associated exclusively with camphorweed (Heterotheca subaxillaris).

Behaviour and ecology

Predators
Z. heterothecae is predated by the two-spotted stink bug (Perillus bioculatus) and the Spined soldier bug (Podisus maculiventris).

References

External links

Multiple images of Zygogramma heterothecae

Chrysomelinae
Beetles described in 1896
Beetles of North America